Värska Parish was a rural municipality of Estonia, in Põlva County. It had a population of 1,344 (as of 1 January 2009) and an area of 187.82 square kilometers.

Settlements
Small borough
Värska
Villages
Koidula • Kolodavitsa • Kolossova • Korela • Kostkova • Kremessova • Kundruse • Litvina • Lobotka • Lutepää • Määsovitsa • Matsuri • Nedsaja • Õrsava • Pattina • Perdaku • Podmotsa • Popovitsa • Rääptsova • Saabolda • Saatse • Samarina • Säpina • Sesniki • Tonja • Treski • Ulitina • Vaartsi • Väike-Rõsna • Vedernika • Velna • Verhulitsa • Võpolsova • Voropi

Gallery

See also
Saatse Boot

References

External links